Zerbi is a surname. Notable people with the surname include:

Gabriele Zerbi (1445–1505), Italian physician and professor
Giovanni Vincenzo Zerbi, 17th-century Italian painter
Tranquillo Zerbi (1891–1939), Italian engineer